The 1942–43 Toronto Maple Leafs season was Toronto's 26th season in the National Hockey League (NHL).

Offseason

Regular season

Final standings

Record vs. opponents

Schedule and results

Playoffs

Player statistics

Regular season
Scoring

Goaltending

Playoffs
Scoring

Goaltending

Awards and records

Transactions
September 11, 1942: Acquired Rhys Thomson from the Brooklyn Americans in Special Dispersal Draft
October 1, 1942: Signed Benny Grant as a War-Time Replacement
October 4, 1942: Traded Gordie Drillon to the Montreal Canadiens for $30,000
October 9, 1942: Acquired Mel Hill from the Brooklyn Americans in Special Dispersal Draft
November 7, 1942: Acquired Ross Johnstone from the Buffalo Bisons of the AHL for cash
November 18, 1942: Signed Free Agent Johnny Ingoldsby
November 27, 1942: Acquired Babe Pratt from the New York Rangers for Red Garrett and Hank Goldup
February 3, 1943: Acquired Buck Jones and loan of Ab DeMarco from the Providence Reds of the AHL for loan of George Boothman and loan of Jack Forsey
February 28, 1943: Acquired Ted Kennedy from the Montreal Canadiens for Frank Eddolls
March 15, 1943: Signed Free Agent Joe Klukay

References

Toronto Maple Leafs seasons
Toronto
Toronto